Rychnov nad Kněžnou is a town in the Hradec Králové Region of the Czech Republic. It has about 11,000 inhabitants. The historic town centre is well preserved and is protected by law as an urban monument zone.

Administrative parts

Villages of Dlouhá Ves, Jámy, Lipovka, Litohrady, Lokot, Panská Habrová and Roveň are administrative parts of Rychnov nad Kněžnou.

Geography
The western part of the municipal territory lies in the Orlice Table and includes most of the built-up area.

The town is situated on the Kněžna River. The streams Liberský and Javornický joins Kněžna in the municipal territory. Near the town is the Les Včelný Nature Park.

History
The first written mention of Rychnov nad Kněžnou is from 1 February 1258 in a deed of Ottokar II of Bohemia, where Heřman of Rychnov was mentioned. In 1561, Rychnov was promoted to a royal town by Ferdinand I. The town hall in Rychnov was first documented in 1596.

In 1640, the Rychnov estate was bought by the Kolowrat family. During the Thirty Years' War, the town was badly damaged. In 1676, František Karel I Kolowrat had a new castle built here. The castle was gradually expanded by other family members.

Until 1918, the town was part of Austria-Hungary and head of the Reichenau District, one of the 94 Bezirkshauptmannschaften in Bohemia.

In 1950, several municipalities were joined to Rychnov nad Kněžnou. On 1 January 1990, four parts of Rychnov nad Kněžnou became three separate municipalities (Jahodov, Lukavice and Synkov-Slemeno).

Demographics

Transport
Rychnov nad Kněžnou is the starting point of a short railway line of local importance heading to Častolovice.

Sights

Rychnov nad Kněžnou is known for the Baroque Kolowrat's castle. It contains rich collection of arts and books, and it includes the Museum and Gallery of Orlické Mountains and a castle park. The church next to the castle is Church of the Holy Trinity, which is known for the third largest bell in the country. The church is used for religious and cultural purposes.

The historic town centre is formed by Staré Square. It comprises preserved burgher houses and Neoclassical former town hall from 1802–1804, which serves today as a tourist information centre. Near the square there is the Church of Saint Gall. It was built in the late 13th century and repaired in pseudo-Gothic style in 1893. The bell tower was built in 1870–1871 in pseudo-Romanesque style.

The former synagogue contains Memorial of Karel Poláček, the most notable local native, and a Jewish museum.

Notable people
Jan Antonín Vocásek (1706–1757), painter
Karel Poláček (1892–1945), writer and humourist
Jaroslav Weigel (1931–2019), painter, actor and writer
Remigius Machura (born 1960), shot putter
Petr Stančík (born 1968), writer and poet
Dan Vávra (born 1975), video game writer, director and designer

Twin towns – sister cities

Rychnov nad Kněžnou is twinned with:
 Kłodzko, Poland

References

External links

Cities and towns in the Czech Republic